Yuri Alexandrovich Orlov (Yurij, Juriy, Jurii) (June 12, 1893 — October 2, 1966) — Russian Empire and Soviet zoologist, paleontologist. Academician of the USSR Academy of Sciences (from 1960, corresponding member since 1953).

His father was Alexander Fedorovich Orlov (1855–1940), member of Narodnaya Volya, official of Udel department of Vologda and Arkhangelskls Governorates.  His mother was Vera Pavlovna Tumarkin (1862–1899), from Bessarabian Jewish merchants family, the older sister of Anna Tumarkin. She served as an otolaryngology doctor at St. Petersburg's Conservatory.

Orlov studied zoology and anatomy at the State University of St. Petersburg under A.A. Zavarzin. He then taught from 1916 to 1924 at the Medical Faculty of the University of Perm, during the Russian Civil War turmoil under some very difficult conditions. and from 1924 to 1935 at the Institute for Brain Research and the Military Medical Academy in Leningrad. At that time, he studied the nervous system of arthropods. From 1925 he devoted his research interests to paleontology, the old love of his youth, and joined A.A. Borisyack.. He taught at the Mining Academy in Leningrad and from 1939 at the Lomonosov State University in Moscow.

He was the chief editor of a fifteen-volume series "Fundamentals of paleontology." In 1967 he was awarded the Lenin Prize posthumously.

Director of the Paleontological Institute, The Academy of Sciences of the USSR (1945–1966).

In 1955 he signed a Letter of Three Hundred against notorious Stalinist Trofim Lysenko.

Memory 
Moscow Paleontological Museum is named after him in Moscow, Russia.

Scientific works 
Main publications in other than Russian languages:
 Orlov J. A.  // Z. wiss. Zool. 1924. Bd 122. H. 3/4. S. 452-502.
 Orlov J. A.  1925. Bd 4. H. 1. S. 101-148.
 Orlov J. A.  // Ibid. Bd 2. H. 1. S. 39-110.
 Orlov J. A.  // Z. wiss. Biol. 1928. Bd 8. H. 3. S. 493-541.
 Orlov J. A.  // Centbl. Mineral. Geol. Paläont. 1931. Abt. B. 500-507.
 Orlov J. A. Short guide to the exhibition for the XVII International geological congress // M.; L.: Acad. Sci. USSR, 1937. 29 p. 
 Orlov J. A. Tertiary mammals of Kazakhstan // Journal of Mammalogy, 1938. Vol. 19. N 4. P. 475-477. 
 Orlov J. A. Perunium ursogulo Orlov a new gigantic extinct mustelid: (A contributribution to the morphology of the skull and brain and to the phylogeny of mustelidae) // Acta zool. 1948. Bd 29. H. 1. S. 63-105.
 Orlov J. A. Florentino Ameghino y su contribución al desarrollo de la paleontología de los vertebrados // Homenaje a Ameghino en Moscú. Buenos Aires: IRC Argentina-URSS, 1954. P. 5-25.
 Orlov J. A. A note on palaeontological institutions in the USSR // J. paleontol. Soc. India. 1956. Vol. 1. P. 92-93.
 Orlov J. A. Les deinocephales des couches permiennes supérieures de la moyenne Volga // Problèmes actuels de paléontologie: [Paris, 18-23 Avril, 1955]. Paris, 1956, p. 59-67.  (Coll. Intern. Centre nat. rech. sci.; № 60).
 Orlov J. A. Principal results of investigations in the palaeontology of vertebrates in the USSR // Congresso geológico internacional (XX ses. México, 1956): Resúmenes de los trabajos presentados. México: Talleres, 1956. P. 121.
 Orlov J. A. Brithopodidae // Traité de Paléontologie: T. 6. Vol. 1. Paris: Masson et Compagnie, 1961. P. 70-79.
 Orlov J. A. Deuterosauridae Seeley, 1894 // Ibid. P. 271-275.
 Orlov J. A. Venyukovioidea // Ibid. P. 279-282.
 Orlov J. A. Dans le monde des animaux anciens: Étude de la paléontologie des vertébrés. Paris: Bureau rech. geôl. minieres, 1962. 123 p.

External links 
 Photo gallery: Y.A. Orlov 120 years.
 Yurij Alexandrovich Orlov memorial number. Journal of the Palaeontological Society of India. 1977. Vol. 20.

Citations

1893 births
1966 deaths
People from Ulyanovsk Oblast
People from Syzransky Uyezd
Soviet zoologists
Paleontologists from the Russian Empire
Paleontological Journal editors
Saint Petersburg State University alumni
Academic staff of Perm State University
Academic staff of Moscow State University
Full Members of the USSR Academy of Sciences
Lenin Prize winners
Recipients of the Order of Lenin